The Kusunda or Ban Raja ("people of the forest"), known to themselves as the Mihaq or Myahq (< *Myahak), are a tribe of former hunter-gatherers of the forests of western Nepal, who are now intermarried with neighboring peoples and settled in villages.

In 1968 American anthropologist Johan Reinhard located a few of the last surviving Kusunda near Gorkha in Central Nepal, and in 1969 and 1975 he found further members in Dang and Surkhet valleys in western Nepal, collecting basic linguistic and ethnographic data (see references below). Shortly earlier, in about 1956, René Nebesky-Wojokowitz wrote a report after he was told by villagers of Kusundas conducting silent trade with Nepali farmers. The Kusunda were said to have brought a deer hunted recently and left it for a farm household with the unspoken expectation that the farmers would give the Kusunda farm goods.

The Kusunda mainly hunted birds resting in trees at night with bows and exceptionally long (ca. 160 cm) unfeathered arrows, which were poorly suited for the hunting of land animals. Their custom of eating only the meat of wild animals extended until recent times. The Kusunda are followers of animism, though Hindu overtones may be seen in their religious rituals. According to the 2011 Nepal census, there are a total of 273 ethnic Kusunda. In 2001 Census, there were 164 Kusunda of whom 160 were Hindus and 4 were Buddhists. The Nepali word Kusunda originally meant "savage", as the neighboring Chepang and other groups traditionally thought of them as savages.

Kusunda language

Watters (2005) published a mid-sized grammatical description of the Kusunda language, plus vocabulary, which shows that Kusunda is indeed a language isolate. Nepali is now their language of everyday communication. The language is almost moribund, with no children learning it, as all Kusunda speakers have married outside their ethnicity. Only one speaker survives in Nepal, an elderly woman.

Notes

References
Reinhard, Johan (1968)  “The Kusunda: Ethnographic Notes on a Hunting Tribe of Nepal.” Bulletin of the International Committee on Urgent Anthropological Ethnological Research 10:95-110, Vienna.
Reinhard, Johan (1969)  "Aperçu sur les Kusunda: Peuple Chasseur du Népal."  Objets et Mondes 9(1):89-106, Paris.
Reinhard, Johan (1976)  “The Bana Rajas: A Vanishing Himalayan Tribe.” Contributions to Nepalese Studies 4(1):1-22, Kathmandu.
Reinhard, Johan and Sueyoshi Toba (1970)  A Preliminary Linguistic Analysis and Vocabulary of the Kusunda Language. Kathmandu: Summer Institute of Linguistics/Tribhuvan University.
D. E. Watters (2005): Notes on Kusunda Grammar: A language isolate of Nepal. Himalayan Linguistics Archive 3. 1-182. NFDIN Katmandu, .

External links
 Genetic evidence for origins of Ban Rajas (Kusundas) of Nepal
 Ethnologue reports the Kusunda language to be extinct.
 P. Whitehouse, T. Usher, M. Ruhlen & William S-Y. Wang (2004): Kusunda: An Indo-Pacific language in Nepal, PNAS 101:5692–5695 (free access) attempts to link Kusunda to other languages, using old data.
 BBC News: Nepal's mystery language on the verge of extinction
 2011 Nepal's Census 

Ethnic groups in Nepal